Daniel Riordan is an American actor. He is best known for providing the voice of Alduin, the main antagonist of The Elder Scrolls V: Skyrim.

Filmography

Film

Television

Video games

References

External links

Living people
American male film actors
American male television actors
American male video game actors
American male voice actors
Place of birth missing (living people)
Year of birth missing (living people)